Eli is an unincorporated community in Cherry County, Nebraska, United States. Its population is approximately 60-75 people, but exact census information has not been collected. The nearest town is Merriman,  to the west.

The nearest municipal airport is Martin Municipal Airport, located in Martin, South Dakota,  to the northwest.

History
Eli was named for Daniel Webster Hitchock, a railroad employee whose nickname was "Get-there-Eli".

A post office was established at Eli in 1909, and remained in operation until it was discontinued in 1967.

References
 DeLorme (2003). Nebraska Atlas & Gazetteer. Yarmouth, Maine: DeLorme. 

Populated places in Cherry County, Nebraska
Unincorporated communities in Nebraska